Gulliver Preparatory School or simply Gulliver Prep, is a private co-educational school. Its management offices are in Kendall, a census-designated place in Miami-Dade County, Florida. Its four campuses are across the county.

Previously the administrative offices were in Coral Gables.

History 
Gulliver Academy was founded in 1926. Gulliver Preparatory opened in 1975. The Miller Drive Campus opened in 1996. In 2021 Gulliver Preparatory broke ground on a new center for student life, which will be located at its Marian C. Krutulis PK-8 Campus. The center is the first major construction undertaken as part of the school's new master plan. It is also part of Gulliver's long-term plan to consolidate its four academic campuses into two.

Campuses 
More than 2,200 students are enrolled at Gulliver’s four campuses. The campuses operated by Gulliver schools include:
 Gulliver Prep - Executive Office
 Gulliver Prep - Marian C. Krutulis PK-8 Campus - Coral Gables
 Gulliver Prep - Montgomery Campus - Pinecrest - Formerly Pinecrest Middle School
 Gulliver Prep - Upper School Campus- Pinecrest
 Gulliver Prep - Upper School Miller Campus - Olympia Heights - Formerly Pinecrest Prep Campus

Accreditation 
Gulliver Prep is accredited by five agencies: the Southern Association of Independent Schools (SAIS), the Southern Association of Colleges and Schools (SACS), the Florida Council of Independent Schools (FCIS), the Florida Kindergarten Council (FKC), and the Commission on International and Trans-Regional Accreditation (CITA).

Academics 
Gulliver Prep offers honors, International Baccalaureate program, Advanced Placement,  work and extracurricular experiences. The average class size at Gulliver is 16 students; the student/teacher ratio is approximately 8-to-1. Gulliver offers more than 30 AP courses, an internship program, and dual enrollment opportunities at the University of Miami, Florida International University  and Miami-Dade College.

Gulliver Preparatory awards the International Baccalaureate Diploma.

Academic Programs are offered at all campuses. The Marian C. Krutulis PK-8 campus offers middle school students Gateway to Technology and Gateway to Technology for Girls. The Upper School Campus Signature Academic Programs include architecture, biomedical sciences, engineering, international business and entrepreneurship and law and litigation.

Age discrimination lawsuit
In 2014, Patrick Snay, a former headmaster for the Miami, Florida location, was awarded a settlement of $80,000 related to an age discrimination complaint he had brought against the institution when his 2010 to 2011 contract was not renewed. Snay's daughter, Dana Snay, posted information about the settlement on social media and the social media post was used as evidence that the Snays had violated the non-disclosure agreement with Gulliver Preparatory; courts ultimately ruled in the school's favor.

Notable alumni 
 R. Alexander Acosta, National Labor Relations Board, United States Secretary of Labor
Michael Baiamonte, Miami Heat PA announcer
 George P. Bush, grandson of President George H.W. Bush, nephew of President George W. Bush, son of Governor Jeb Bush, current Commissioner of the Texas General Land Office
 Soman Chainani, author of The School for Good and Evil series
 Nelson Dellis, 2011, 2012, 2014, 2015, 2021USA Memory champion
 Tony Dokoupil, American broadcast journalist and co-anchor, CBS This Morning
Sylvia Fowles, WNBA basketball player (2015 WNBA Finals MVP) and Olympic gold medalist at the 2008 Beijing Olympics (transferred from Miami Edison High School)
 Joe Jackson (defensive end, born 1996), Dallas Cowboys defensive end
 Craig Gottlieb, cast member on History Channel's Pawn Stars
 Enrique Iglesias, singer and musician
 Julio Iglesias Jr., singer and musician
 Buck Ortega, professional football player
Marysol Patton, The Real Housewives of Miami
 Patrick Robinson, New Orleans Saints defensive back
 Steven Rodriguez, baseball player
 Blake Ross, co-creator, Mozilla Firefox
Tina Rivers Ryan, curator, art historian
 Eduardo Saverin, co-founder of Facebook
 Andrew Talansky, professional triathlete and retired professional cyclist on the Cannondale-Drapac cycling team
 Sean Taylor, former professional football player for the Washington Redskins
CJ Donaldson, College Football Player

Athletics 
Gulliver's teams, The Raiders, have won district, regional, sectional, state runner-up and state championships, as well as numerous conference championships. Gulliver currently competes in the 4A classification. The Miami Herald awarded Gulliver the All Sports Award for having the top program for small schools in Miami-Dade County, and the Florida High School Activities Association ranked Gulliver Schools 2nd in the state in the 2A and 3A classifications dependent upon sport.

The football field was renamed Sean Taylor Memorial Field on September 5, 2009 in honor of the late football player.

FHSAA team championships by sport 

Source: FHSAA.org

References

External links 
 Gulliver Schools home page retrieved on January 3, 2016. "Executive Office: 9350 South Dixie Highway, 11th Floor Miami, Florida 33156[...]Academy - Marian C. Krutulis Campus: 12595 Red Road Coral Gables, Florida 33156[...]Montgomery Drive Campus: 7500 SW 120 Street Pinecrest, Florida 33156[...]Preparatory School: 6575 North Kendall Drive Pinecrest, Florida 33156[...]Miller Drive Campus: 8000 SW 56 Street Miami, Florida 33155  • 305.274.9535

Preparatory schools in Florida
Private K-12 schools in Miami-Dade County, Florida
1926 establishments in Florida
Educational institutions established in 1926
Kendall, Florida
Coral Gables, Florida